Tunji is a Yoruba male given name. It is loosely interpreted as re-awake.
Notable people includes 
Tunji Oyelana Nigerian musician
Tunji Awojobi Nigerian professional basketball player
Tunji Olurin  Former military Governor of Oyo State
Tunji Kasim Scottish actor
Tunji Banjo Nigerian-Irish professional footballer
Tunji Sowande  Nigeria-born United Kingdom lawyer and musician
Tunji Otegbeye  Nigerian politician
Sarafa Tunji Ishola  Nigeria's former Minister of Mines and Steel Development

See also
Olatunji 

Yoruba given names